Pradhan Mantri Ujjwala Yojana (PMUY, translation: Prime Minister's Lighting Scheme) was launched by Prime Minister of India Narendra Modi on 1 May 2016 to distribute 50 million LPG connections to women of Below Poverty Line (BPL) families.

Overview 
In the first year of its launch, the connections distributed were 22 million against the target of 15 million. As of 23 October 2017, 30 million connections were distributed, 44% of which were given to families belonging to scheduled castes and scheduled tribes. The number crossed 58 million by December 2018. 

In 2018 Union Budget of India, its scope was widened to include 80 million poor households. 21,000 awareness camps were conducted by oil marketing companies (OMC). The scheme led to an increase in LPG consumption by 56% in 2019 as compared to 2014. 

The highly popular scheme has benefited over 14.6 million BPL families in Uttar Pradesh, 8.8 million in West Bengal, 8.5 million in Bihar, 7.1 million in Madhya Pradesh, 6.3 million in Rajasthan and 3.24 million in Tamilnadu.

On 7 Sep 2019, Prime Minister Narendra Modi distributed a fuel cylinder to the 8th crore beneficiary under this scheme.

In the Union Budget of 2021-2022, the government announced that 1 crore more connections will be provided under this scheme. The Prime Minister launched the Ujjwala Scheme II on 10 August 2021 to provide fuel to 1 crore families who were left out of the first scheme.

At the 107th Indian Science Congress held in January 2020 in Bengaluru, Narendra Modi declared that technology has helped India "in recognizing the 8 crore [80 million] women who were still using coal or wood for cooking" and also "in understanding how many new distribution centres must be built, via the help of technology".

The National Family Health Surveys demonstrate significant improvement in access to cleaner cooking fuels due to PMUY. Yearly growth in access to cleaner fuel accelerated around 2015 and increased by almost seven times, from 0.8% in rural areas before 2015 to 5.6% after.

India's Gas cylinder penetration has improved from 62 percent in May 2016 to 99.8 percent on 1 April 2021.

statistics
To increase the number of beneficiaries under the Ujjwala scheme, by renovating the structure, it is easy to bring the last mile beneficiaries under the scheme, so the government also tried to renovate the structures. Direct and indirect employments were also increased through it.

Ujjwalla Scheme I statistics by state wise

On 7 Sep 2019, the number of beneficiaries under Ujjwala Scheme I touched 8 crore. Number of beneficiaries state wise.

History

 On 16 October 2009, the Government of India launched the RGGLV (Rajiv Gandhi Gram LPG Vidarak Yojana) scheme, which aims to increase LPG penetration and establish LPG distributors in remote and inaccessible areas. 

 In 2009, the government also launched a scheme to provide one-time financial assistance for LPG connections to Below Poverty Line (BPL) households. The assistance was provided through the Corporate Social Responsibility (CSR) Fund of the government's Oil Marketing Companies (OMCs).

 In 2015, Rajiv Gandhi Gram LPG Vidarak scheme was discontinued. 

 From 2009 to 2016, 1.62 crore households were provided with LPG before the Ujjwala scheme. 
On 31 March 2016, the subsidy for purchase of fuel given to below poverty line households through the Corporate Social Responsibility Fund was discontinued.

See also

 DigiLocker (easier access to online identity proof and services)
 Har ghar jal (water connection for each house)
 Ration card (India) (food security card)
 Pradhan Mantri Awas Yojana (affordable housing for all)
 Saubhagya scheme (electrification of all houses)
 Swachh Bharat Abhiyan (toilet for all houses)

References

External links
 Official Website
 How to Apply Online For New Ujjwala 2.0 Connection

Ministry of Petroleum and Natural Gas
Projects established in 2016
Narendra Modi
Modi administration initiatives
Government schemes in India